Kuraľany is a village and municipality in the Levice District in the Nitra Region of Slovakia.

History
In historical records the village was first mentioned in 1223.

Geography
The village lies at an altitude of 162 metres and covers an area of 10.685 km². It has a population of about 577 people.

Ethnicity
The village is approximately 97% Slovak, 3% Magyar

Facilities
The village has a public library and football pitch.

External links
 
 
https://web.archive.org/web/20070427022352/http://www.statistics.sk/mosmis/eng/run.html

Villages and municipalities in Levice District